The torrent sculpin (Cottus rhotheus) is a species of ray-finned fish belonging to the family Cottidae, the typical sculpins. It is found in the United States and Canada, inhabiting upper Fraser River drainage in British Columbia to the Nehalem River in Oregon (including the Columbia River drainage of British Columbia, Washington, Idaho, Montana and Oregon. It reaches a maximum length of 15.5 cm. It prefers swift waters of small to large rivers with stable gravel or rubble bottoms, and rocky lake shores.

References

Cottus (fish)
Fish described in 1882
Taxa named by Rosa Smith Eigenmann